Mont Lozère et Goulet is a commune in the department of Lozère, southern France. The municipality was established on 1 January 2017 by merger of the former communes of Le Bleymard (the seat), Bagnols-les-Bains, Belvezet, Chasseradès, Mas-d'Orcières and Saint-Julien-du-Tournel.

See also 
Communes of the Lozère department

References 

Communes of Lozère